The Magic Christian  may refer to:

 Magic Christian (magician) (born 1945)
 Magic Christian Music, an album by Badfinger featuring three songs from the 1969 film 
 The Magic Christian (film), a 1969 film
 The Magic Christian (novel), a 1959 comic novel by Terry Southern

See also
 Christian views on magic
 Magic cristian, American musician Phil Cristian